"A Decade Under the Influence" is a song by American rock band Taking Back Sunday. The song was released as the lead single from the band's second studio album Where You Want to Be. "A Decade Under the Influence" would become the band's breakout single, peaking at no. 16 on the Billboard Alternative Songs chart and no. 70 on the UK Singles Chart.

Composition
The song started out as riff written by rhythm guitarist Eddie Reyes. Vocalist Adam Lazzara wrote the lyrics after he had broken up with a long-time girlfriend; his ex-girlfriend had purchased tickets for the pair to attend a Coldplay concert and, despite the two having broken up, still went to the show together. Lazzara called the car ride a very awkward experience. The song itself is about someone who realizes he understands less about the world than he had originally thought.

Track listing
CD single

7" single

Charts

References

External links
Official Music Video at YouTube

2004 songs
2004 singles
Taking Back Sunday songs
Victory Records singles